Duplicaria duplicata, common name the duplicate auger, is a species of sea snail, a marine gastropod mollusk in the family Terebridae, the auger snails.

Description
The size of the shell varies between 20 mm and 93 mm.

Distribution
This marine species occurs in the Red Sea, in the Indian Ocean off Madagascar and Tanzania; off Japan and the Solomon Islands.

References

Bibliography
 Terryn, Y. (2007). Terebridae: A Collectors Guide. Conchbooks & Natural Art. 59pp + plates.

External links
 

Terebridae
Gastropods described in 1758
Taxa named by Carl Linnaeus